The National Alliance for Public Charter Schools is a non-profit trade association serving the charter school industry.

NAPCS advocates for all charter schools including those that contract with charter management organizations and education management organizations. Their mission is to ensure all children have access to a high-quality public education regardless of their zip code.

History

The organization was founded in 2005 with the support of the Doris & Donald Fisher Fund, Walton Family Foundation, the Annie E. Casey Foundation and the Bill & Melinda Gates Foundation.

Activities

NAPCS publishes an annual guide to state charter school laws, Measuring Up to the Model: A Ranking of State Charter School Laws.

NAPCS once published an annual report on the enrollment of charter schools, Estimated Charter Public School Enrollment.

However, they now have an interactive dashboard that can be found at data.publiccharters.org.

Critics describe the organization as cheerleading for charter schools, rather than drilling down to academic performance statistics.

United States Secretary of Education Betsy DeVos is a fan of the National Alliance for Public Charter Schools.

References

Charter school organizations in the United States